The Temple of Jupiter is a ruined Roman temple in Silifke, Turkey. It was built in the 2nd century, and presently one column still stands.

Silifke is an ilçe (district) in Mersin Province. Although the city which was founded by Seleucus I Nicator is an old city, the ground level of the city was elevated because of the floods caused by Göksu River (Calycadnus of the antiquity) and there aren't many archaeological remains on the surface of the present city fabric. Presently, there is no official restoration work on the ruins. But they are protected by fencing.

History
Jupiter's Temple was built in the 2nd century AD during the Roman Empire.  According to a legend told by the historian Zosimus of the 5th century, when the fields around Silifke were infested by grasshoppers, Silifke citizens asked the god Apollo to protect their crop. Apollo sent a flock of grasshopper-eating birds. The people built the temple to show their gratitude.

It was a peripteros type temple with 14x 8 corinthian columns. Its outer dimensions were  length and  width. Presently only one column is standing. During the Byzantine Empire era, the temple was transformed into a church.

See also
List of Ancient Roman temples

References

Buildings and structures in Mersin Province
2nd-century religious buildings and structures
Temples of Jupiter